Tareythang is a small village located in Pakyong sub division at the Pakyong District of Sikkim state in India. This village is about 1250 m above sea level with a sub-tropical climate. It is 12 kilometers away from Pakyong. In electoral roll of 2011, Tareythang comes under the Assembly Constituency of Chujachen.

Etymology
The legends of the village says that the name Tareythang comes from two words 'Tarey' which means the Tarey Bhir and the word 'Thang' means the plain land. It means the plain land under Tarey bhir is called as Tareythang.

Population Composition
Nepali-speaking people comprising Bahun, Chettri, Darjee and Sunar constitutes the majority of the population at Tareythang.

Economy
People are mainly engaged in primary sector like house farming, Agriculture, pitty business, Horticulture etc. People engaged in agriculture produce as their main crops every year is Paddy (Dhaan), Maize (Makkai), Broom Plant (Kuccho),  millet (Kodho), Ginger (Adhuwa), vegetables products & less quantity of cardamom (Aalinchi).

Geography
As per the report of Sikkim Statistical Journal, published from Department of Economics, Statistics, Monitoring & Evaluation, Government of Sikkim, Tareythang has a total area of 223.17 Hactare and is located at an average elevation of 333 metres (1093 feet).

Transport

Taxis/Jeep services access the towns and cities like Gangtok, Siliguri, Pakyong, Singtam, Rangpo, Majitar,  Rorathang, Rhenock, Ranipool, Kumrek, Melli, Sevoke and Rongli from the village.

One Sikkim Nationalised Transport (SNT) bus connects Tareythang to Gangtok daily (except Sunday & Govt. Holidays) via Pakyong and Ranipool. The bus departs from Tareythang at 7:30 am and reaches Gangtok around 9:30-10:30 am. For its return journey the bus departs from Gangtok at 3:30 pm and reaches Tareythang around 5:30-6:30 pm.

Education
Government Secondary School Tareythang, Government Primary School Kapurpathey and Sanskrit Paathsaala Tareythang are the important educational institutes in the middle of the village. There is also one important Library in Tareythang which is called Tareythang Saraswati Pustakalaya.Most of the youngsters are away from the village because of their job. Youngsters from the village are engaged in Private & Govt. sector in Capital city Gangtok and some other states as well as abroad for their studies & job.

Healthcare

There is one Primary Health Sub Centre providing some basic healthcare services in Tareythang. It is operated by Government of Sikkim. The nearest advanced Healthcare Providers are STNM Gangtok, CRH Tadong, and Pakyong PHC.

Demographics

As of the 2011 Census of India, Tareythang had a total 161 households and a population of 736. Male population was 370, while female population was 366. It has an average literacy rate of 84.78%, higher than the state average of 81.42%: male literacy is 93.43%, and female literacy is 75.78%.

Sex Ratio
In Tareythang village population of children with age 0-6 is 79 which makes up 10.73% of total population of village. Average Sex Ratio of Tareythang village is 989 which is higher than Sikkim state average of 890. Child Sex Ratio for the Tareythang as per census is 1257, higher than Sikkim average of 957.

Tareythang Data
According to the 2011 Census, Tareythang data are as under:

Caste Wise data of the Village
As per 2011 census, Schedule Caste (SC) constitutes 13.04% while Schedule Tribe (ST) were 0.95% of total population in Tareythang village.

Work Profile of the Village

As per official census data of 2011, in Tareythang out of total population of 736, 361 were engaged in work activities. 68.14% of workers describe their work as Main Work (Employment or Earning more than 6 Months) while 31.86% were involved in Marginal activity providing livelihood for less than 6 months. Of 361 workers engaged in Main Work, 121 were cultivators (owner or co-owner) while 32 were Agricultural labourer.

Notable people
 Trilochan Pokhrel, Sikkimese freedom fighter.
 Raju Kafley, Film Director

Attractions
Attractions in and around Tareythang are as follows:
 Tarkeshwar Shivalaya Mandir, Tareythang
 Banday Pokhrel View Point.
 Indreni Waterfalls.
 Donok Khola Waterfalls.
 Donok Biyasi (Beautiful Agricultural Farmland) in Lower Tareythang 
 Tareythang Saraswati Pustakalaya.
 Rangpo Khola in Lower Tareythang. Etc.

References

Villages in Pakyong district
Pakyong district